Janet Lewis may refer to:

 Janet Cook Lewis (1855-1947), American librarian and bookbinder
 Janet Lewis (1899-1998), American novelist, poet, and librettist
 Janet Lewis-Jones (1950-2017), member for Wales on the BBC Trust